Vilcún (Mapudungun for "lizard") is a Chilean town and commune in Cautín Province, Araucanía Region. The town is an important gateway for tourists visiting Conguillío National Park and Llaima volcano.

The commune also includes the localities of Cherquenco, San Patricio, General López and Cajón.

Demographics
Of these, 9,024 (40.1%) lived in urban areas and 13,467 (59.9%) in rural areas. The population grew by 7.7% (1,604 persons) between the 1992 and 2002 censuses.

Administration
As a commune, Vilcún is a third-level administrative division of Chile administered by a municipal council, headed by an alcalde who is directly elected every four years. The 2008-2012 alcalde is Patricio Villanueva Rubilar (PPD).

Within the electoral divisions of Chile, Vilcún is represented in the Chamber of Deputies by Enrique Estay (UDI) and Fuad Chahín (PDC) as part of the 49th electoral district, together with Victoria, Curacautín, Lonquimay, Melipeuco, Lautaro, Perquenco and Galvarino. The commune is represented in the Senate by Alberto Espina Otero (RN) and Jaime Quintana Leal (PPD) as part of the 14th senatorial constituency (Araucanía-North).

References

External links

  Municipality of Vilcún
  Regional Government of Araucanía: Vilcún

Communes of Chile
Populated places in Cautín Province
1926 establishments in Chile